Texas's 32nd congressional district of the United States House of Representatives serves a suburban area of northeastern Dallas County and a sliver of Collin and Denton counties. The district was created after the 2000 United States census, when Texas went from 30 seats to 32 seats. It was then modified in 2011 after the 2010 census. The current representative is Democrat Colin Allred.

Among other communities, the district includes part of the North Dallas neighborhood of Preston Hollow, which has been the home of George W. Bush since the end of his presidency.  While it previously contained much of the Western Dallas County area, including Irving, since the 2011–2012 redistricting cycle, the district now covers mostly the Northern and Eastern Dallas County areas, and a small portion of Collin County.

In 2018, civil rights attorney and former NFL player Colin Allred won a heavily contested primary for the Democratic nomination, and defeated Republican incumbent Pete Sessions in the November 6 election. The district, like most suburban districts in Texas, had long been considered solidly Republican. However, it is now considered more of a swing district as a result of changing demographics, along with antipathy towards former President Donald Trump in suburban areas.

Election results from presidential races

List of members representing the district

Recent elections

2004
In the 2004 election, Martin Frost, the Democratic representative from Texas's 24th congressional district, who had been redistricted out of his district in Fort Worth, Arlington, and parts of Dallas, decided to run against Sessions rather than challenge Kenny Marchant or Joe Barton.  Sessions benefited from President George W. Bush's endorsement to win in this Republican-leaning district.

2006

In 2006, Dallas lawyer (and cousin of Arkansas Senator Mark Pryor) Will Pryor unsuccessfully challenged Sessions, and lost by a large margin.

2008

In 2008, Sessions successfully faced a challenge by Democrat Eric Roberson and was reelected to another term.

2010

In 2010, Sessions successfully faced a challenge by Democrat Grier Raggio and Libertarian John Jay Myers.  Sessions was reelected to another term.

2012
In 2012, Sessions successfully faced a challenge by Democrat Katherine Savers McGovern and Libertarian Seth Hollist. Sessions was reelected to his 9th term.

2014

In 2014, Sessions successfully faced a challenge by Democrat Frank Perez and Libertarian Ed Rankin. Sessions was reelected to his 10th term.

2016

In 2016, Sessions won an election contested only by third party candidates, as the Democrats did not nominate a challenger. Sessions was reelected to his 11th term.

2018

2020

2022

See also

List of United States congressional districts

References

Sources 
 Congressional Biographical Directory of the United States 1774–present

32
Constituencies established in 2003
2003 establishments in Texas